The 2015 Campeonato Nacional Clausura Scotiabank was the 96th Chilean League top flight, in which Cobresal won its 1st ever league title.

League table

Results

Liguilla Pre-Copa Sudamericana
Following the conclusion of the regular season, the teams placed 2nd to 5th qualified for the Liguilla in order to determine the "Chile 3" spot to the 2015 Copa Sudamericana. However, teams that already played the 2015 Copa Libertadores (from second stage onwards) and the winners of Copa Chile are ineligible to compete in the Liguilla. These teams are the following:
 Colo-Colo (2nd), played in Copa Libertadores.
 Huachipato (3rd), already qualified for the Copa Sudamericana through the aggregate table.
 Universidad de Concepción (6th), winners of Copa Chile.
 Universidad de Chile (7th), played in Copa Libertadores.

Semifinals

Universidad Católica won 5–3 on aggregate.

2–2 on aggregate. San Marcos won 4–2 on penalties.

Final

4–4 on aggregate. Universidad Católica won 6–5 on penalties and qualified for the 2015 Copa Sudamericana.

References

External links
2015 Torneo Clausura at Soccerway

Primera División de Chile seasons
Chile
2014–15 Campeonato Nacional season
2014–15 in Chilean football